Farida Rauf Asha is a Awami League politician and a Member of Parliament from a reserved seat.

Career
Asha was elected to the Parliament from a reserved seat as a Awami League candidate in 1996. In 2012, she was called on by Minister of Telecommunications Rajiuddin Ahmed Raju in Parliament for failing to pay her telephone bills.

References

Awami League politicians
Living people
Women members of the Jatiya Sangsad
7th Jatiya Sangsad members
Year of birth missing (living people)
20th-century Bangladeshi women politicians